Fulham Baths  is a Grade II listed building at 368 North End Road, Fulham, London SW6.

It was built in 1902 by the architect E. Deighton Pearson.

It is now the Dance Attic Rehearsal Studios.

References

Grade II listed buildings in the London Borough of Hammersmith and Fulham
Grade II listed government buildings